Yesaqi or Yasaqi may refer to:
 Yesaqi, Golestan
 Yasaqi, Razavi Khorasan